Well-tempered may refer to:
Well temperament, a method of tuning musical instruments
Well-Tempered Clavier, a composition by Bach